This is a list of governors and administrators of Ondo State. Ondo State was created from part of Western State on 17 March 1976.

See also
States of Nigeria
List of state governors of Nigeria
 list of governors all over the world
 list of governors in an organization

References

External links
"Nigeria death fails to halt poll", BBC News, March 29, 2007.

Ondo